Below is a partial list of shows that were previously aired of DZMM Radyo Patrol 630 and TeleRadyo. For the currently programs see, list of programs broadcast by TeleRadyo.

Previously aired programs

 A.M.Y.- About Me and You (2006–2010)
 Abogado de Kampanilya (1992–2004)
 Aksyon Ngayon (1991–2016)
 All Aboard, Pinoy Abroad (2008–2011)
 Ang mga Payo ni Compañero (1986–2000)
 Anggulo ng mga Report (1999–2000)
 Awit Tawanan (1997–2001)
 Bago 'Yan Ah (1997–2013)
 Bal Domingo Files (1993–2001)
 Balitalakay (1986–1997)
 Bandila sa DZMM (2006–2011, 2017–2019)
 Bantay Kalikasan (2000–2001)
 Barangay Showdown (2004–2006)
 Batas (2000–2004)
 Bravo Express (1989–1999)
 Buhay at Kalusugan (2003–2005)
 Buhay, Buhay, atbp. (1990–2005)
 Business Above Usual (2020–2021)
 The Buzz sa DZMM (2004–2008)
 Calvento Files sa DZMM (1995–2000)
 Careful, Careful sa DZMM (1996–2000)
 CHInoyTV (2020; during the COVID-19 pandemic)
 Chismax: Chismis to the Max (2009–2020)
 Compañero y Compañera (1999–2003)
 Cristy Per Minute (radio edition) (2003–2005; moved to DWFM/Radyo5 as Cristy FerMinute)
 Dear Ate Gel (1999–2003)
 Dear Kuya Cesar (1999–2004)
 Dear Tiya Dely (1999–2001)
 Dos por Dos (2003–2020; moved to DZRH)
 Main afternoon edition (2006–2020)
 Morning edition (2003–2007; 2011–2013)
 Dr. Love: Always and Forever (2011–2017) 
 Dr. Love Radio Show (1997–2022; moved to DWFM/Radyo5)
 Weekday edition (1997–2020)
 Weekend edition (2020–2022)
 Dra. Bles @ Ur Serbis (2001–2020)
 DZMM Balita (1986–2001)
 DZMM Drama Theater (1986–2003)
 DZMM Live (1991–2005)
 Ely Morning (1986–1995; moved to DWIZ)
 Exodus (1986–2004)
 Fastbreak (2014–2020)
 Failon Ngayon sa DZMM/TeleRadyo (2011–2020; moved to DWFM/Radyo5 as Ted Failon at DJ Chacha sa Radyo5)
 Garantisadong Balita (2013–2020)
 Gabay Kalusugan (2004–2010)
 Gising Pilipinas (1990–2020)
 Good Morning Pilipinas! (1986–1990)
 Good Vibes (June 19, 2017–August 28, 2020)
 Healthy Sabado (2018–2020)
 Haybol Pinoy (1992–2004, 2018–2019)
 Hoy, Gising! (1990–1995)
 Himala sa Fatima (October 13, 2019)
 HaPinay (2020–2023)
 Ikaw at ang Batas (1993–2003)
 Ikaw sa Likod ng mga Awit (2006–2007)
 Innermind on Radio (1992–2013; moved to DWIZ as Kapangyarihan ng Isip)
 Isyu Ngayon (2004–2006)
 It's Showtime with Billy Balbastro (1992–2008; originally It's Showtime with Billy and Oskee)
 Ito ang Radyo Patrol (2002–2020)
 Jeep ni Erap (1999–2000)
 Juander Titser (2020–2021)
 Kamusta mga Bisaya (1996–2004)
 Kapamilya Holy Week Recollection (2020; 2021–2022)
 Katapat: Mayor Fred Lim sa DZMM (2004–2010)
 Ka-Date sa DZMM
 Kape at Salita (2018–2021)
 Kitang-Kita ang Kita (1996–2000)
 Knowledge Power (1986–2007)
 Konsyumer Atbp. (2005–2020; moved to DZBB and GTV)
 Konek Todo (2018–2019)
 Kontrapelo (2004–2005)
 Korina sa Umaga (2001–2004)
 Kung May Relos, may Razon (1999–2003)
 Kuwentuhang Lokal (2020–2021)
 Lakas ng Siyensya (July 2–December 24, 2022)
 Laugh Out Loud
 Light Moments (2014–2020)
 Lima at Oro: Tandem! (2010–2018)
 Lima at Logan: Tandem! (2018–2020)
 Lingkod Aksyon (2020–2021)
 LOL: Labor of Love (2020; moved to DZBB and GTV as OMJ: Oh My Job!)
 Lovelines (2004–2007)
 Logan Live (2011–2012)
 Ma-Beauty Po Naman (2004–2020)
 Magandang Gabi, Bayan (1988–2005)
 Magandang Gabi Dok (2008–2017)
 Magandang Morning (2004–2020; moved to DWFM/Radyo5 as Julius and Tintin para sa Pamilyang Pilipino)
 Magandang Morning with Julius and Niña (2011–2015)
 Magandang Morning with Julius and Tintin (2004–2011)
 Magandang Morning with Julius and Zen (2015–2020)
 Magpayo Nga Kayo (2002–2020)
 Maria Flordeluna (2007–2008)
 Matinding Martin D (2001–2004)
 Mel & Jay (1987–1996; moved to DZBB)
 Radio edition (1987–1995)
 TV simulcast (1991–1996)
 Midnight Patrol (1990–1994)
 Mismo (2011–2017)
 Mission X sa DZMM (2001–2004)
 MMDA Metro Traffic Live (2011–2020)
 Modus (1999–2001)
 Moonlight Serenade (2013–2020; moved to DZBB as Golden Memories)
 MOR 101.9 sa DZMM (March 19 – May 5, 2020)
 SLR: Sex, Love & Relationships with Chico Martin
 Dear MOR Midnight Replays
 Music Automation
 Mr. Cariñoso (1991–1999; moved to DZBB)
 Ms M. Confidential (2004–2007)
 Ms. M, Ms. O, Mismo (1999–2000)
 Music and Memories (2007–2013)
 Musika A.T.B.P (2001–2005)
 News Patrol (2005–2020)
 NoliLinggo (1986)
 OA with Onse and Alex (2012–2013)
 Oh Yes, It's Neil Ocampo! (1993–1996)
 OMJ! (2013–2020)
 Pacquiao vs Broner: The DZMM Special (January 20, 2019)
 Pacquiao vs Thurman: The DZMM Special (July 21, 2019)
 P.A.K.S.A.: Pagtalakay at Kaisipan sa mga Isyung Panlipunan (2004–2008)
 Pag-Ibig, Buhay, Atbp. (1986–2001)
 Palibhasa Sunday (1991–1993)
 Pamilyang Pinoy (1994–1999)
 Pantawid ng Pag-ibig: At Home Together Concert (March 22, 2020; together with ABS-CBN, S+A, ANC, Jeepney TV, Asianovela Channel, Metro Channel, MOR Philippines, iWant, TFC, and Myx)
 Para Sa'yo, Bayan (2004–2010)
 Pasada Sais Trenta (1999–2020)
 Pasada Sais Trenta Sabado (2001–2014)
 Pinky at Ricky sa Opinyon (2006–2009)
 Pinoy, Panalo Ka! (2019–2020)
 Pinoy Saykologi (2000–2001)
 Pinoy Vibes (2007–2020; moved to FYE Channel)
 Pintig Balita (2004–2020)
 Private Confessions (2004–2005)
 Private Nights (2007–2020)
 Prrrt! Teka Muna (1994–2003)
 Public Hearing (1993–2000)
 Pulis, Pulis, Kung Umaksyon Mabilis (1993–2001)
 Pulso ng Bayan (1988–2005)
 Radyo Negosyo (2000–2020)
 Radyo OFW (2004–2005)
 Radyo Patrol Balita (2001–2020)
 Radyo Patrol Balita Alas-Dose (2001–2019)
 Radyo Patrol Balita Alas-Dose Weekend (2001–2020)
 Radyo Patrol Balita Alas-Kuwatro (2001–2017)
 Radyo Patrol Balita Alas-Kuwatro Weekend (2001–2020)
 Radyo Patrol Balita Alas-Siyete (2001–2020)
 Radyo Patrol Balita Alas-Siyete Weekend (2001–2020)
 Radyo Patrol Balita Linggo (2011–2018)
 Radyo Patrol Red Alert (1989–2004)
 Radyo, Radyo (2004–2005)
 Radyo Taliba (1987–1990)
 Rated Korina (2012–2014)
 Razon... Sa Likod ng mga Balita (1999–2000)
 Red Alert sa DZMM/TeleRadyo (2013–2020)
 Relos Reports (1993–2001)
 Remember When (2013–2020)
 Rosary Hour (1989–2004)
 S.A.B.A.D.O. (1992–2004)
 Sa Kabukiran (1997–2020; moved to DWIZ as Sa Kabukiran at Kabuhayan)
 Sa Landas ni Hesus: Maglakbay, Magnilay (March 29–31, 2018)
 Salitang Buhay (1995–2020)
 Sagot Ko 'Yan! (2012–2021)
 Showbiz Extra (2005–2007)
 Showbiz Mismo (2004–2011)
 Showbuzz (2017–2020)
 SikaPinoy (1986–2013)
 SOCO sa DZMM (2005–2020)
 Songhits: Tunog Pinoy (February 10–November 17, 2018)
 Sports Talk (2004–2014)
 Sunday Network News sa DZMM (1995–2000)
 TALAKAN: Talakayan at Kantiyawan (2004–2008)
 Talkback sa DZMM (2007–2009)
 Tambalang Failon at Sanchez (1995–2001; 2004–2009)
 Tambalang Failon at Webb (2009–2012) 
 Tanging Yaman (radio drama version) (2000–2001)
 TeleRadyo Balita Weekend (2020–2022)
 Teka Muna (2013–2018)
 The World Tonight (March 19–May 15, 2020; during the COVID-19 pandemic)
 Todo Balita (2001–2010; moved to Radyo5, DZRH, DZRJ, and DZXL)
 Todo-Todo Walang Preno (2003–2020)
 Trabaho Lang, Walang Personalan (1991–1999)
 Trabaho Panalo! (2008–2014)
 Tropang Makulit (1993–1999)
 Tsismis 'To 'Day (1992–1998)
 Turo-Turo (2014–2020)
 U-Talk 2.0 (2002–2007)
 UAAP sa DZMM (radio broadcasts) (2013–2014)
 Usapang de Campanilla (2001–2020)
 Usapang Kalye (2020–2021)
 Usapang Kapatid (2006–2020)
 What It's All About Alfie (2004–2008)
 Wow Trending (2017–2020)
 Yesterday (July 3, 2010–December 27, 2020; moved to DWDM/Eagle FM as Yesterday's Classics)

See also
 List of programs broadcast by TeleRadyo

ABS-CBN Corporation
Philippine radio programs
DZMM